= Studi sul Settecento Romano =

- Discipline: scientific journal of art history
- Language: Italian
- Edited by: Elisa Debenedetti

Publication details
- History: 1985-present
- Publisher: Multigrafica, then Bonsignori; nowadays Quasar (Italy)
- Frequency: yearly

Standard abbreviations
- ISO 4: Studi Settec. Rom.

Studi sul Settecento Romano is an Italian yearly journal of art history, devoted in particular to the study of artistic and architectural culture in eighteenth-century Rome.

It was founded in 1985 by Elisa Debenedetti, its general editor, and is sponsored by Sapienza University of Rome, Fondazione Marco Besso (Marco Besso Foundation) and Centro studi sulla cultura e l’immagine di Roma (Centre for Studies in culture and image of Rome). Until 2012, it was published by Multigrafica, then Bonsignori. It is now published by Quasar.

The journal publishes essays based on archival research, dealing with all artistic forms and their contexts, with a special focus on the period that goes from the end of the seventeenth to the beginning of the nineteenth century. Specific topics are addressed in monographic volumes.

== Volumes ==
- Committenze della famiglia Albani (1985)
- Note sulla Villa Albani Torlonia (1986)
- Ville e palazzi. Illusione scenica e miti archeologici (1987)
- Carlo Marchionni. Architettura, decorazione e scenografia contemporanea (1988)
- L'architettura da Clemente XI a Benedetto XIV. Pluralità di tendenze (1989)
- Temi di decorazione: dalla cultura dell'artificio alla poetica della natura (1990)
- Collezionismo e ideologia: mecenati, artisti e teorici dal classico al neoclassico (1991)
- Architettura città territorio. Realizzazioni e teorie tra illuminismo e romanticismo (1992)
- Alessandro Albani patrono delle arti. Architettura, pittura e collezionismo nella Roma del '700 (1993)
- Roma borghese. Case e palazzetti d'affitto, I (1994)
- Roma borghese. Case e palazzetti d'affitto, II (1995)
- Artisti e mecenati, dipinti, disegni, sculture, carteggi nella Roma curiale (1996)
- '700 disegnatore, inicisioni, progetti, caricature (1997)
- Roma, la case, la città (1998)
- L'arte per i giubilei e tra i giubilei del Settecento, arciconfraternite, chiese, artisti, I (1999)
- L'arte per i giubilei e tra i giubilei del Settecento, arciconfraternite, chiese, personaggi, artisti, decorazioni, guide, II (2000)
- Sculture romane del Settecento, I. La professione dello scultore (2001)
- Sculture romane del Settecento, II. La professione dello scultore (2002)
- Sculture romane del Settecento, III. La professione dello scultore (2003)
- Artisti e artigiani a Roma, I, dagli Stati delle Anime del 1700, 1725, 1750, 1775 (2004)
- Artisti e artigiani a Roma, II, dagli Stati delle Anime del 1700, 1725, 1750, 1775 (2005 - Premio Giacomo Lumbroso, IX edizione)
- Architetti e ingegneri a confronto, I. L'immagine di Roma fra Clemente XIII e Pio VII (2006)
- Architetti e ingegneri a confronto, II. L'immagine di Roma fra Clemente XIII e Pio VII (2007)
- Architetti e ingegneri a confronto, III. L'immagine di Roma fra Clemente XIII e Pio VII (2008)
- Collezionisti, disegnatori e teorici dal Barocco al Neoclassico, I (2009)
- Collezionisti, disegnatori e pittori dall'Arcadia al Purismo, II (2010)
- Palazzi, chiese, arredi e scultura, I (2011)
- Palazzi, chiese, arredi e pittura, II (2012)
- Artisti e artigiani a Roma, III, dagli Stati delle Anime del 1700, 1725, 1750, 1775 (2013)
- Antico, Città, Architettura, I, dai disegni e manoscritti dell'Istituto Nazionale di Archeologia e Storia dell'Arte (2014)
- Antico, Città, Architettura, II, dai disegni e manoscritti dell'Istituto Nazionale di Archeologia e Storia dell'Arte (2015)
- Giovanni Battista Piranesi predecessori, contemporanei e successori (2016)
- Temi e ricerche sulla cultura artistica, I. Antico, Città, Architettura, III (2017)
- Johann Joachim Winckelmann (1717-1768) nel duplice anniversario (2018)
- Temi e ricerche sulla cultura artistica, II. Antico, Città, Architettura, IV (2019)
- Aspetti dell'arte del disegno: autori e collezionisti, I - Antico, Città, Architettura, V (2020)
- Cardinal Alessandro Albani. Collezionismo, diplomazia e mercato nell'Europa del Grand Tour. Collecting, dealing and diplomacy in Grand Tour Europe (2021)
- Aspetti dell'arte del disegno: autori e collezionisti, II (2022)
- Artisti e artigiani a Roma, IV, dagli Stati delle Anime del 1700, 1725, 1750, 1775 (2023)
- Il Settecento e l'Antico, I (2024)
